Garrow's Law is a British period legal drama about the 18th-century lawyer William Garrow. The series debuted on 1 November 2009 on BBC One and BBC HD. A second series was announced on 7 July 2010 and was broadcast from 14 November 2010. A third series consisting of four episodes was commissioned and was aired from 13 November 2011. Garrow's Law was cancelled after three series in February 2012.

Summary
Set around trials at the Old Bailey in Georgian London against a backdrop of corruption and social injustice, Garrow's Law is a legal drama inspired by the life of pioneering barrister William Garrow.

The series, co-created by Tony Marchant, is based on real legal cases from the late 18th century, as recorded in the Old Bailey Proceedings. Andrew Buchan as Garrow leads a cast including Alun Armstrong and Lyndsey Marshal.

From rape and murder to high treason and corruption, each episode begins with the investigation of a real crime sourced from the published accounts of Old Bailey trials, available in a fully searchable edition online. In an age when few of the accused could afford defence counsel, the youthful Garrow and his associate John Southouse (pronounced soot-house), a solicitor, work to uncover the truth or fight for justice, championing the underdog and pioneering the rigorous cross-examination of prosecution witnesses that paved the way for the modern legal system.

A gifted maverick, at times arrogant and with a burning sense of destiny, Garrow is driven to change the nature of the trial, thereby creating powerful enemies both in the corrupt underworld and among the political elite.

A major subplot running through the series concerns Garrow's relationship with Lady Sarah Hill, an aristocratic figure with an interest in justice and the law. This almost cost Garrow his life in episode three when Garrow challenges Silvester, his main courtroom rival, to a duel when Silvester insinuates that Garrow and Lady Sarah's relationship has become intimate and then refuses to withdraw the allegation. Lady Sarah's husband is Sir Arthur Hill, an important politician and member of the government. The storyline continues when Sir Arthur accuses his wife of adultery with Garrow and refuses Lady Sarah her son by claiming him as his property. The subplot concludes in the last episode of series three.

As well as William Garrow, the series also includes other non-fictional characters, most notably Sir Francis Buller, a controversial judge of the age, and barrister  John Silvester. However, the series is not a biographical documentary, and Garrow was not actually involved in all of the cases depicted. According to Mark Pallis, the story editor of Garrow's Law, the show "aims to give viewers a real sense of what life was like in legal London towards the end of the 18th century; to give people a chance to experience the big legal landmarks and the cases that caused a stir at the time." The rolling subplot involving Garrow's relationship with Lady Sarah Hill is based on his real relationship with Sarah Dore, who had previously had a child with Sir Arthur Hill, Bt., Viscount Fairford, but departs significantly from the facts, as she was never married to Hill.

Cast and characters

Main
Andrew Buchan as William Garrow
Alun Armstrong as John Southouse
Lyndsey Marshal as Lady Sarah Hill
Rupert Graves as Sir Arthur Hill, Bt
Aidan McArdle as Silvester
Michael Culkin as Judge Buller

Recurring
Anthony Bowers as Court Clerk
Stephen Boxer as Viscount Melville
Anton Lesser as John Farmer
Harry Melling as George Pinnock

Episode list

Series one

Series two

Series three

Home media

iTunes release
Garrow's Law was released on the iTunes Store on 1 November 2009.

DVD
The first series of Garrow's Law was released on DVD on 4 January 2010 and the second on 7 February 2011.
Series Three was released on 6 February 2012.

References

John Hostettler (Lawyer and Author), Fighting for Justice: The History and Origins of Adversary Trial, Waterside Press, 2006
John Hostettler (Lawyer and Author) and Richard Braby (a direct descendant of Garrow), Sir William Garrow: His Life, Times and Fight for Justice, Waterside Press, 2009
Tim Hitchcock and Robert Shoemaker, Tales from Hanging Court, Hodder Arnold, 2007

External links
 

BBC Tony Marchant on Garrow's Law

The Old Bailey Online, 1674-1913 (a scholarly edition of the original source material)
Garrow's Law (Blog of the Legal & Historical Consultant, and Story Editor to Garrow's Law, Mark Pallis)

2009 British television series debuts
2011 British television series endings
2000s British drama television series
2000s British legal television series
2010s British drama television series
2010s British legal television series
BBC television dramas
British drama television series
Television shows set in London
Scottish television shows
Television series set in the 18th century
Films shot in Edinburgh